The Bangla Academy Literary Award (Bangla Academy Shahitya Puroshkar), is given by the Bangla Academy of Bangladesh in recognition of creative genius in advancement and overall contribution in the field of Bengali language and literature.

It was introduced in 1960 and recognized six categories: poetry, novels, short stories, essays, children's literature and translation. Beginning in 1985, two more awards were introduced to recognize overall contributions to Bengali language and literature.

At present, the Bangla Academy award is given in three fields:
 Poetry, novel, and short story
 Research, essay, and science
 Translation, drama, and juvenile literature

Awards by decade
Following are lists of recipients of the award since 1960.
 List of Bangla Academy Literary Award recipients (1960–69)
 List of Bangla Academy Literary Award recipients (1970–79)
 List of Bangla Academy Literary Award recipients (1980–89)
 List of Bangla Academy Literary Award recipients (1990–99)
 List of Bangla Academy Literary Award recipients (2000–09)
 List of Bangla Academy Literary Award recipients (2010–19)
 List of Bangla Academy Literary Award recipients (2020-29)

See also
 Ekushey Padak
 Ananda Purashkar
 Sahitya Akademi Award to Bengali Writers
 Rabindra Puraskar

References

External links
 Bangla Academy (official site)

Civil awards and decorations of Bangladesh
Bengali literary awards
Bangladeshi literary awards
Bangla Academy